Fried pickles, or frickles are a side dish and appetizer found commonly in the Southern U.S. They are made by deep-frying sliced battered dill pickles.

Fried pickles first appeared on the American culinary scene in the early 1960s. The first known fried pickle recipe was printed in the Oakland Tribune on November 19, 1962, for "French Fried Pickles," which called for using sweet pickle slices and pancake mix.

Fried dill pickles were popularized by Bernell "Fatman" Austin in 1963 at the Duchess Drive In located in Atkins, Arkansas.  The Fatman's recipe is only known to his family and used once each year at the annual Picklefest in Atkins, held each May. The recipe for Fried pickle at Wikibooks is a general one.

Fried pickles are served at food festivals and menus of individual and chain restaurants throughout the United States and elsewhere.  They can be eaten as an appetizer or as an accompaniment to other dishes.  Fried pickles are frequently served with a ranch dressing or other creamy sauce for dipping. In 1963, before the culinary world knew of ranch dressing, the Fatman offered ketchup as a dipping sauce.

See also
 List of deep fried foods
 List of pickled foods

References

Pickles
Snack foods
Cuisine of the Southern United States
Deep fried foods